William Gore (19 November 1919 – 13 April 2010) was a Welsh rugby union, and professional rugby league footballer who played in the 1940s.

Outside of rugby
Billy Gore born in Blaina, Wales he worked as a foundryman while playing for Newbridge RFC, he became a landlord of public house(s), he was a lifelong Labour Party supporter, and was elected as a Councillor, he  became chairman of Gwent County Council, and Mayor of Nantyglo, and he died aged 90 in Nevill Hall Hospital, Abergavenny, Wales.

International honours
Billy Gore won caps for Wales (RU) while at Newbridge RFC in 1947 against Scotland, France, and Ireland.

Genealogical Information
Billy Gore was the son of the rugby union, and rugby league footballer who played in the 1920s; Jack Gore.

References

External links
Search for "Gore" at rugbyleagueproject.org
Statistics at wolvesplayers.thisiswarrington.co.uk

1919 births
2010 deaths
Newbridge RFC players
Publicans
Rugby league hookers
Rugby league players from Blaina
Rugby union hookers
Rugby union players from Blaina
St Helens R.F.C. players
Wales international rugby union players
Warrington Wolves players
Welsh rugby league players
Welsh rugby union players